Giuliana Dudok (born 20 August 2000) is a Uruguayan swimmer. She competed in the women's 50 metre backstroke event at the 2018 FINA World Swimming Championships (25 m), in Hangzhou, China.

References

2000 births
Living people
Uruguayan female swimmers
Female backstroke swimmers
Place of birth missing (living people)